The waldzither (German: "forest zither") is a plucked string instrument from Germany that came up around 1900 in Thuringia. It is a type of cittern that has nine steel strings in five courses. Different types of waldzither come in different tunings, which are generally open tunings as usual in citterns. The most common type has the tuning C3*G3 G3*C4 C4*E4 E4*G4 G4.

Producers of the waldzither attempted to establish it as a national instrument of Germany in the first half of the 20th century, when more complicated instruments were hard to get and to afford. Martin Luther was popularly said to have played a similar cittern at the Wartburg.

Waldoline

When the lowest single course is omitted, it is sometimes called a waldoline, a portmanteau of waldzither and mandoline.

See also
Cittern
Halszither
Portuguese guitar
English guitar

References

External links

 The Waldzither Page
 Die Waldzither 
 Waldzither article at musicaviva.com
 ATLAS of Plucked Instruments

German musical instruments
Mandolin family instruments